Ballinrobe Racecourse is a horse racing venue in Ballinrobe, County Mayo, Ireland. It is the only race course in County Mayo, and hosts both flat and national hunt events.

References

External links
 Official website

Horse racing venues in the Republic of Ireland
Sports venues in County Mayo